The canton of Le Pays Messin is an administrative division of the Moselle department, northeastern France. It was created at the French canton reorganisation which came into effect in March 2015. Its seat is in Courcelles-Chaussy.

It consists of the following communes:
 
Antilly
Argancy
Ars-Laquenexy
Ay-sur-Moselle
Bazoncourt
Burtoncourt
Chailly-lès-Ennery
Charleville-sous-Bois
Charly-Oradour
Chesny
Chieulles
Coincy
Colligny-Maizery
Courcelles-Chaussy
Courcelles-sur-Nied
Ennery
Les Étangs
Failly
Flévy
Glatigny
Hayes
Jury
Laquenexy
Maizeroy
Malroy
Marsilly
Mécleuves
Mey
Noisseville
Nouilly
Ogy-Montoy-Flanville
Pange
Peltre
Raville
Retonfey
Sainte-Barbe
Saint-Hubert
Saint-Julien-lès-Metz
Sanry-lès-Vigy
Sanry-sur-Nied
Servigny-lès-Raville
Servigny-lès-Sainte-Barbe
Silly-sur-Nied
Sorbey
Trémery
Vantoux
Vany
Vigy
Vry

References

Cantons of Moselle (department)